Patricia Charlotte Perrin (11 July 1921 – 12 November 1988) was a New Zealand potter. She was born in Auckland, New Zealand on 11 July 1921 and died at Auckland Hospital on 12 November 1988. 

Perrin began to learn pottery by taking night classes at Avondale College, and was taught by Robert Field. Within three years Perrin was herself teaching at Avondale College.

Her works are held in the collection of the Auckland Art Gallery Toi o Tāmaki and the Museum of New Zealand Te Papa Tongarewa.

Perrin exhibited with:
 Auckland Society of Arts
 New Zealand Academy of Fine Arts
 The Group in 1951

Further information 

Artist files for Patricia Perrin are held at:
 Robert and Barbara Stewart Library and Archives, Christchurch Art Gallery Te Puna o Waiwhetu
 Fine Arts Library, University of Auckland
 Hocken Collections Uare Taoka o Hākena
 Te Aka Matua Research Library, Museum of New Zealand Te Papa Tongarewa
Also see:
 Peter Cape, Artists and Craftsmen in New Zealand, Auckland, London: Collins, 1969 
 Douglas Lloyd Jenkins, Patricia Perrin: New Zealand potter, Auckland: Corban Estate Arts Centre, 2005.

References

1921 births
1988 deaths
People from Auckland
New Zealand potters
Women potters
20th-century ceramists
New Zealand women ceramicists
People associated with The Group (New Zealand art)